Pay it forward is an expression for describing the beneficiary of a good deed repaying the deed to others instead of to the original benefactor.

Pay It Forward may also refer to:

 Pay It Forward (financial aid policy), a US model for financing higher education
 Pay It Forward (novel), a 1999 novel by Catherine Ryan Hyde
 Pay It Forward (film), a 2000 film based on the novel

Paying It Forward may refer to:

 "Paying It Forward", a 2003 short story by Michael A. Burstein
 Paying it Forward, a 2017 GoFundMe campaign centered in Philadelphia, Pennsylvania, ultimately revealed to be a scam

See also
 Pay It (disambiguation)